The 1919 The Citadel Bulldogs football team represented The Citadel, The Military College of South Carolina in the 1919 college football season.  George Rogers returned to lead the Bulldogs for the 1919 season after a three-year absence.  His second tenure as head coach lasted just one season.  The Bulldogs played as members of the Southern Intercollegiate Athletic Association and played home games at College Park Stadium in Hampton Park.

Schedule

References

Citadel
The Citadel Bulldogs football seasons
Citadel Bulldogs football